Bluffton High School may refer to:

Bluffton High School (Indiana), located in Bluffton, Indiana
Bluffton High School (Ohio), located in Bluffton, Ohio
Bluffton High School (South Carolina), located in Bluffton, South Carolina